Giovanni Francesco Verdurae (died 1572) was a Roman Catholic prelate who served as Bishop of Chiron (1549–1572).

Biography
On 7 Jun 1549, Giovanni Francesco Verdurae was appointed during the papacy of Pope Paul III as Bishop of Chiron. He served as Bishop of Chiron until his death in 1572.

References 

16th-century Roman Catholic bishops in the Republic of Venice
Bishops appointed by Pope Paul III
1572 deaths